James Price (born 8 January 1992) is a South African first class cricketer. He was included in the Eastern Province cricket team squad for the 2015 Africa T20 Cup. Price went to school at St. Andrew's College, Grahamstown.

References

External links
 

1992 births
Living people
South African cricketers
Eastern Province cricketers
Cricketers from Port Elizabeth
Alumni of St. Andrew's College, Grahamstown